Yoshinobu is a masculine Japanese given name.

Possible writings
Yoshinori can be written using many different combinations of kanji characters. Here are some examples: 

義信, "justice, believe"
義伸, "justice, extend"
義延, "justice, extend"
佳信, "skilled, believe"
佳伸, "skilled, extend"
佳延, "skilled, extend"
善信, "virtuous, believe"
吉信, "good luck, believe"
吉伸, "good luck, extend"
良信, "good, believe"
恭信, "respectful, believe"
嘉信, "excellent, believe"
嘉伸, "excellent, extend"
嘉延, "excellent, extend"

The name can also be written in hiragana よしのぶ or katakana ヨシノブ.

Notable people with the name
, better known as James Iha, Japanese-American rock musician
, Japanese footballer
, Japanese architect
, Japanese politician
, Japanese footballer
, Japanese film director and executive
, Japanese footballer and manager
, Japanese politician
, Japanese professional wrestler
Ikuya Sawaki (real name  (born 1951), Japanese voice actor 
, Japanese footballer
, Japanese weightlifter
, Japanese Shinto priest and scholar
, Japanese swimmer
, Japanese samurai
, Japanese politician
, Japanese film producer
, Japanese music arranger and guitarist
, Japanese politician
, Japanese poet
Yoshinobu Ota (太田 義信, born 1972), Japanese mixed martial artist
Yoshinobu Oyakawa (親川 義信, born 1933), Japanese-American swimmer
, Japanese daimyō
, Japanese politician
, Japanese baseball player and manager
, Japanese daimyō
, Japanese shōgun
, Japanese golfer
, Japanese baseball player

See also
Yoshinobu Station, a railway station in Matsuno, Kitauwa District, Ehime Prefecture, Japan
Yoshinobu Launch Complex, a launch site at the Tanegashima Space Center
Tokugawa Yoshinobu-ke

Japanese masculine given names